Bagshaw is a hamlet in Derbyshire, England. The hamlet falls within the civil parish of Chapel-en-le-Frith.
It is about 1.2 km or 0.75 miles east of Chapel-en-le-Frith, and within the boundaries of the Peak District National Park. It is in the valley of a small stream which flows westward towards the Black Brook. It has a small Methodist chapel.

References

External links

Villages in Derbyshire
Towns and villages of the Peak District
Chapel-en-le-Frith